At the 1928 Winter Olympics one individual Nordic combined event was contested. It was held on Friday, February 17, 1928 (cross-country skiing) and on Saturday, February 18, 1928 (ski jumping). Unlike today the ski jump was the last event held. Both events were also individual medal events.

Medalists

Results

Final standings

Participating nations
A total of 35 Nordic combined skiers from 14 nations competed at the St. Moritz Games:

References

External links
International Olympic Committee results database
Official Official Olympic Report
sports-reference
 

 
1928 Winter Olympics events
1928
1928 in Nordic combined
Nordic combined competitions in Switzerland
Men's events at the 1928 Winter Olympics